The large moth family Gelechiidae contains the following genera:

Sarotorna
Satrapodoxa
Sattleria
Sautereopsis
Schistonoea
Schistophila
Schistovalva
Schizovalva
Schmidtnielsenia
Schneidereria
Scindalmota
Sclerocecis
Sclerocopa
Sclerograptis
Sclerophantis
Scodes
Scrobipalpa
Scrobipalpoides
Scrobipalpomima
Scrobipalpula
Scrobipalpuloides
Scrobischema
Scrobitasta
Scythostola
Semnostoma
Semocharista
Semophylax
Sicera
Siderea
Simoneura
Sinevia
Sinoe
Sitotroga
Smenodoca
Sophronia
Sorotacta
Spermanthrax
Sphagiocrates
Sphaleractis
Sphenocrates
Sphenogrypa
Sriferia
Stachyostoma
Stagmaturgis
Stegasta
Stenoalata
Stenolechia
Stenolechiodes
Stenovalva
Steremniodes
Stereodmeta
Stereomita
Sterrhostoma
Stibarenches
Stigmatoptera
Stomopteryx
Streniastis
Strenophila
Streyella
Strobisia
Struempelia
Symbatica
Symbolistis
Symmetrischema
Symmetrischemulum
Symphanactis
Synactias
Syncathedra
Syncopacma
Syncratomorpha
Syndesmica
Syngelechia
Syngenomictis
Syringopais
Syrmadaula
Systasiota

References
 Natural History Museum Lepidoptera genus database

Gelechiidae
Gelechiid